Balkfontein is a small village in Nala Local Municipality in the Lejweleputswa District of the Free State in South Africa.

The village houses the "Sedibeng Water" utility that operates a water purification works drawing water from the Vaal River inlet. The small town has residences and facilities, including a golf course, for employees of Sedibeng.

References

Populated places in the Nala Local Municipality